John Salusbury or Salesbury may refer to:
 John Salusbury (died 1540s), courtier and knight of the shire for Denbighshire
 John Salusbury (died 1578), knight of the shire for Denbighshire
 John Salesbury (1533–1580), member of parliament for Merioneth, Denbigh Boroughs, and Denbighshire
 Sir John Salusbury (poet) (1567–1612), Welsh poet and politician
 Sir John Salusbury, 4th Baronet (died 1684), English politician
 John Salusbury (MP) (died 1685), Welsh politician
 Sir John Salusbury (diarist) (1707–1762), Welsh diarist and explorer

See also
 John Salisbury (disambiguation)
 Salusbury family